Southern Telecom is the wireline, fiber optic telecommunications subsidiary of Southern Company (NYSE: SO). Established in 1997 as an Exempt Telecommunications Company (ETC) pursuant to the Telecommunications Act of 1996, Southern Telecom is headquartered in Atlanta, Georgia.

External links
Southern Telecom Official Site
Southern Company

Notes

Southern Company
Telecommunications companies of the United States